Keskstaadion may refer to:

Kalevi Keskstaadion, a multi-purpose stadium in Tallinn, Estonia
Valga Keskstaadion, a multi-purpose stadium in Valga, Estonia